Victoire Pisa is a retired Japanese Thoroughbred racehorse and active sire. After winning three of his four starts as a juvenile, the colt won the Satsuki Shō at Nakayama Racecourse in April 2010. After an unsuccessful campaign in Europe he returned to Japan to win the weight-for-age invitational Arima Kinen in December. In the following spring he was sent to Dubai where he raced for the first time on a synthetic track in the Dubai World Cup. He defeated an international field to become the first Japanese-trained horse to win the world's most valuable race. His subsequent career was restricted by injury problems and he was retired at the end of 2011.

Background
Victoire Pisa is a dark bay horse bred at the Shadai Farm in Hokkaido. His sire Neo Universe, a son of the thirteen-time leading sire in Japan Sunday Silence, was a successful Japanese performer, winning the Satsuki Shō and the Tokyo Yūshun, the first two legs of the Japanese Triple Crown in 2003. At stud he has sired the Satsuki Shō winner Unrivaled and the Tokyo Yūshun winner Logi Universe. Victoire Pisa's dam Whitewater Affair was a successful British racehorse who won the John Porter Stakes and the Prix de Pomone as a four-year-old in 1997. At stud in Britain she bred the Yasuda Kinen winner Asakusa Denen, and was then exported to Japan where her other foals included the Group Three winner Swift Current. The colt was prepared for racing by Katsuhiko Sumii, the trainer of Delta Blues and Vodka.

Racing career

2009: two-year-old season
Victoire Pisa opened his racing career with three races at Kyoto Racecourse in late 2009. On 25 October he ran in a nine furlong event for unraced horses in which he finished second to Rose Kingdom, a colt who went on to win the Japan Cup. Two weeks later he recorded his first win in a ten furlong maiden race. On 28 November Victoire Pisa started the 1/2 favourite for the Kyoto Nisai Stakes and won by one and a half lengths. On his final start of the year he was moved up in class for the domestic Group Three Radio Nikkei Hai Nisai Stakes at Hanshin Racecourse on 26 December. Starting the 3/5 favourite he took the lead near the finish and won by a neck from Cosmo Phantom.

2010: three-year-old season

Victoire Pisa began his three-year-old season in March at Nakayama Racecourse in the Hochi Hai Yayoi Shō, a trial race for the Satsuki Shō. Despite having to be switched to obtain a clear run he took the lead 50 yards from the line and won by half a length from Eishin Apollon. In the Satsuki Shō a month later he started the 1.3/1 favourite in a field of eighteen three-year-old colts. Ridden by Yasunari Iwata he again struggled to get a clear run in the straight before accelerating through a gap along the rail to take the lead inside the final furlong and win from Hiruno d'Amour, Eishin Flash and Rose Kingdom. On 30 May Victoire Pisa started 11/10 favourite for the Tokyo Yushun over one and a half miles at Tokyo Racecourse. Yet again, he had a troubled passage, and was in eighth place two furlongs from the finish. Despite making steady progress in the closing stages he finished third behind Eishin Flash and Rose Kingdom.

Victoire Pisa was then sent to Europe where he was trained with the Prix de l'Arc de Triomphe as his main objective. He finished fourth behind Behkabad in the Prix Niel at Longchamp Racecourse in September and then finished seventh of the nineteen runners behind Workforce in the Arc a month later. On his return from Europe, Victoire Pisa was made a 27/1 outsider for the Japan Cup at Tokyo on 28 November. In a controversial race the colt took the lead in the straight but was overtaken by Buena Vista inside the final furlong and lost second place on the line to Rose Kingdom. An inquiry by the racecourse stewards saw the winner disqualified for causing interference to the runner-up. Victoire Pisa was one of fifteen horses invited to contest the Arima Kinen on 26 December at Nakayama. Ridden for the first time by the Italian jockey Mirco Demuro he started at odds of 7.4/1 in a field which included Buena Vista, Eishin Flash, Dream Journey and Oken Bruce Lee. In front of a crowd of 120,813 Victoire Pisa was always among the leaders and moved up quickly to take the lead entering the straight. He held off the late challenge of the favourite Buena Vista to win by a nose. Demuro described the winner as "a fantastic horse" with a "great heart".

At the end of the season, Victoire Pisa was voted Japanese Champion Three-year-old colt.

2011: four-year-old season

On his first appearance as a four-year-old, Victoire Pisa started the 2/5 favourite for the Nakayama Kinen over nine furlongs on 27 February. He took the lead in the straight and won comfortably by two and a half lengths from Captain Thule. The colt was then sent to the United Arab Emirates to contest the Dubai World Cup at Meydan Racecourse on 26 March. The race was run over ten furlongs on a synthetic Tapeta footings surface and attracted runners from Britain, Ireland, South Africa, Saudi Arabia and the United States. Demuro restrained the colt in last place before moving up to join the leaders half a mile from the finish of a slowly run race. He took the lead in the straight and held off the challenge of his fellow Japanese challenger Transcend by half a length with Monterosso in third and Cape Blanco in fourth. Victoire Pisa became the first Japanese-trained horse to win the "world's richest race". The victory was an emotional one for the Japanese contingent, coming less than three weeks after the country had been struck by an earthquake and tsunami: Demuro returned to the winner's enclosure in tears, whilst Katsuhiko Sumii said that he felt that "the whole country was behind me." Victoire Pisa was sent to Europe again but did not contest any races after sustaining a series of leg injuries.

Victoire Pisa returned to Japan at the end of the year but was unable to reproduce his early season form. He finished thirteenth behind Buena Vista in the Japan Cup and eighth behind Orfevre in the Arima Kinen. He was retired from racing at the end of December. Sumii commented on the colt's retirement by saying that "I feel I should apologise to him because I couldn't get him back to his best but at least I am happy that I can send him to the stud without any further accidents". Victoire Pisa was named Japanese Champion Older Male for 2011.

Stud record
Victoire Pisa was retired from racing to become a breeding stallion at the Shadai Stallion Station. He made an immediate impact by siring the Oka Sho winner Jeweler in his first crop of foals.

Pedigree

References

Racehorses bred in Japan
Racehorses trained in Japan
2007 racehorse births
Dubai World Cup winners
Thoroughbred family 8-d